Charles-Henri Paliard (born 26 April 1968) is a French former ice dancer. With Doriane Bontemps, he won bronze at the 1985 World Junior Championships, after placing sixth a year earlier. They won two senior international medals — bronze at the 1985 Nebelhorn Trophy and silver at the 1985 Grand Prix International St. Gervais.

References 

1968 births
French male ice dancers
Living people
World Junior Figure Skating Championships medalists